General elections were held in Bermuda on 5 October 1993. The result was a victory for the United Bermuda Party, which won 22 of the 40 seats in the House of Assembly.

Results

References

Elections in Bermuda
Bermuda
General election
Bermuda
Bermuda
Election and referendum articles with incomplete results